Leonard Vella (born 1940) is an American former Canadian football tackle who played for the Edmonton Eskimos.

Early life

Career

Personal life

Achievements and honours

References

Living people
1940 births
Edmonton Elks players